The Jaega (also Jega, Xega, Jaece, Geiga) were Native Americans living in a chiefdom of the same name, which included the coastal parts of present-day Martin County and northern Palm Beach County, Florida at the time of initial European contact, and until the 18th century. The area occupied by the Jaega corresponds to the East Okeechobee Area, an archaeological culture that is part of, or closely related to, the Belle Glade culture. The name Jobé, or Jové , has been identified as a synonym of Jaega, a sub-group of the Jaega, or a town of the Jaega.

History

The East Okeechobee Area has received relatively little attention from archaeologists, and little is known of the origins of the Jaega. The earliest mention of the Jaega came from Hernando de Escalante Fontaneda, who was held captive by indigenous peoples in Florida for 17 years until 1665 or 1666. He relates that the Jaega, along with the Ais and the obscure Guacata, salvaged precious metals and other goods from ships that wrecked along the Florida coast. Escalante Fontaneda also implied that the Jaega spoke the same language as the Ais, who lived along the Indian River Lagoon to the north of the Jaega. The Jaega may have been related to the Ais people, who occupied the coast to their north. (The Ais language has been linked to the Chitimacha language by linguist Julian Granberry.) The Jaega were linked to the Ais by marriage between chiefs and their relatives.

In 1665, the Spanish built the Presidio of Santa Lucia at what is probably the present-day St. Lucie River in the territory of the Ais people. The Spanish were soon driven out of Ais territory and built a new fort called Santa Lucia at the Jupiter Inlet, in Jaega territory. The Jaega were initially friendly towards the Spanish, but later attacked the presidio and forced the Spanish to withdraw less than a year later. Jonathan Dickinson placed the Ais town he called Santa Lucea two days' travel north of the Jupiter Inlet. The names Jaega and Jobé (or variants thereof) appear on 17th-century Spanish maps of Florida, and in Spanish reports.

The displayed partial map is titled Planta de la costa de la Florida'y en que paraje La Laguna de Ma'ymi'y adonde se ha de hacer un fuerte (Map of the coast of La Florida and in which spot the Lake of Maimi and to where we have to make a fort) dated circa 1600. The original is in the Archives of the Indies in Sevilla, Spain, identified as Maps de Mexico y Florida from the collection of Pedro Torre Lanzas, cartographer unknown. A reproduction is held by the Library of Congress.
It shows the relative locations of Saint Augustine (S Agustin), Cape Canaveral (Cabo de Cañabezal), as well as the approximate territories of the Ays (Ais) and Xega tribes.

Jonathan Dickinson, who was part of a shipwrecked party detained in the town of Jobé for several days in 1696, wrote a Journal that contains descriptions of the people of Jobé (near present-day Jupiter Inlet). He wrote that Jobé was subject to the Ais chief who resided in Jece (near present-day Vero Beach).

Culture
There is little written history about the Jaega. They were likely similar in culture and custom to the surrounding Calusa, Tekesta and Ais tribes. The indigenous peoples of South Florida were all hunter-gatherers. Food was abundant enough to make agriculture unnecessary. Middens (Refuse mounds), consisting mostly of oyster and conch shells, also contain clues to the Jaega culture. Their diet consisted mainly of fish, shellfish, sea turtles, deer and raccoon, as well as wild plants including cocoplums, sea grapes, palmetto berries and tubers. Bits of broken pots and scraps of grass skirts demonstrate that crafts including pottery and weaving were known and practiced. One of the largest and best preserved Jaega middens is within what is now DuBois Park at the Jupiter Inlet Historic and Archeological Site, across from the Jupiter Inlet Lighthouse.

Although there are no deposits of flint in South Florida, flint dart points have been found at Jaega sites, indicating trade with northern tribes. The people used wood, bone and shell to craft tools and weapons.

Spanish reports describe elaborate ceremonies involving an elite class of priests, hundreds of singers and dancers, and complex ritual practice.

Later names
The geographic name "Hobe Sound" is derived from the name of the Jaega village of Jobé. The Spanish pronounced the name "Ho-bay," which has evolved into the current anglicized "Hobe" (which is pronounced like "robe"). The name of the Jupiter Inlet may have been derived from "Jové", anglicized as "Jove".

Notes

References 

Native American history of Florida
Native American tribes in Florida
Indian River Lagoon
Martin County, Florida
Palm Beach County, Florida
Former chiefdoms in North America